Bystander Nunatak is a nunatak in New Zealand,  high, lying  southwest of Forsythe Bluff, on the west side of Daniels Range in the Usarp Mountains. The name applied by the northern party of the New Zealand Geological Survey Antarctic Expedition, 1963–64, is suggestive of the aspect of this relatively isolated feature.

References 

Nunataks of Oates Land